Fibulacaris is a monotypic genus of fossil arthropod known only by one species, Fibulacaris nereidis, discovered from the Cambrian Burgess Shale of Canada It was characterized by a bivalved carapace with an inverted rostrum, sandwiching the slender body with stalked eyes and homonomous appendages. It was probably an actively swimming filter feeder and possibly swam upside-down like some branchiopod crustaceans and horseshoe crabs. Phylogenetic analysis suggest it was a relative or member of Hymenocarina, which contains other bivalved arthropods.

References

Burgess Shale fossils
Prehistoric arthropod genera

Cambrian genus extinctions
Hymenocarina